is a Japanese football player, who plays for Vonds Ichihara. He was born in Osaka, but grew up in Itabashi, Tokyo.

References

External links

J. League (#24)

1988 births
Living people
Senshu University alumni
Association football people from Osaka Prefecture
Association football people from Tokyo
Japanese footballers
J2 League players
JEF United Chiba players
Gainare Tottori players
Vonds Ichihara players
Association football defenders